Guy C. H. Corliss (July 4, 1858 – November 24, 1937) was an American judge who was one of the first three justices of the Supreme Court of North Dakota from 1889 to 1898.

Early life and education 
He was born in Poughkeepsie, New York on July 4, 1858. He attended elementary school in Poughkeepsie and later graduated Poughkeepsie High School at the age of 14 in 1873. Afterwards, he clerked in a store while studying law at the office of Poughkeepsie attorney J. S. Van Cleef.

Career 
Corliss was admitted to the New York Bar in September 1879 at the age of 21. He practied law in New York until he moved to Grand Forks, Dakota Territory in 1883. In Grand Forks, he practiced law in partnership with J. H. Bosard until the fall of 1889 when he was elected at the age of 31 to serve as a judge of the North Dakota Supreme Court and became the first chief justice. He was then nominated for reelection in 1892, running with no opposition. He served on the court for eight years and eight months, resigning on August 15, 1898. 

After retiring from the court, Corliss returned to Grand Forks to practice law. He also organized the University of North Dakota School of Law alongside the university's president, Webster Merrifield and served as the inaugural dean of the law school from 1889 until 1902. He then returned to legal practice, but remained a part-time professor of law until moving out of the state of North Dakota in 1912.

In 1930, Corliss received a Doctor of Laws degree from the University of North Dakota.

Legacy
The Phi Alpha Delta legal fraternity chapter at the law school was named the Guy C.H. Corliss Chapter upon being founded.

Family 
He married Miss Effie V. Edson of Clifton Springs, New York on April 6, 1883, and had four children.  His grandson, Kenneth Corliss, won a bronze star in World War II.

Death 
He died in Portland, Oregon in on November 24, 1937 at the age of 79.

References

External links
North Dakota Supreme Court biography

Corliss, Guy C.H.
1858 births
1937 deaths
Deans of law schools in the United States
University of North Dakota faculty
University of North Dakota alumni
North Dakota lawyers
People from Poughkeepsie, New York
People from Grand Forks, North Dakota
19th-century American judges